Čenkov is a municipality and village in Příbram District in the Central Bohemian Region of the Czech Republic. It has about 400 inhabitants. It lies on the Litavka river.

History
The first written mention of Čenkov is from 1368.

References

 

Villages in Příbram District